The Red City (1909) is a historical novel by the American writer Silas Weir Mitchell.  The novel is set in Philadelphia in the 1790s, during the second term of George Washington's Presidency when the city served as the temporary capital of the United States. Its general theme is of the city's "greatness" during this era. The "red city" of the title is a reference to the red brick used for many of Philadelphia's public and private buildings in the eighteenth century.

The book depicts the Yellow Fever Epidemic of 1793, which engulfed the city.

Bibliography
 Thomas George E., Cohen Jeffrey A. & Lewis, Michael J. Frank Furness: The Complete Works. Princeton Press, 1996.

1909 American novels
Novels by Silas Weir Mitchell
Novels set in Philadelphia
Novels set in the early national era United States
American historical novels
Novels set in the 1790s